The 1920 Indiana gubernatorial election was held on November 2, 1920. Republican nominee Warren T. McCray defeated Democratic nominee Carleton B. McCulloch with 54.63% of the vote.

Primary elections
Primary elections were held on May 4, 1920.

Democratic primary

Candidates
Carleton B. McCulloch
Mason J. Niblack
John Isenbarger
James K. Risk

Results

Republican primary

Candidates
Warren T. McCray, Chairman of the Food Conservation Committee of Indiana
James W. Fesler
Edward C. Toner

Results

General election

Candidates
Major party candidates
Warren T. McCray, Republican
Carleton B. McCulloch, Democratic

Other candidates
Andrew J. Hart, Socialist
James M. Zion, Farmer–Labor
Charles M. Kroft, Prohibition

Results

References

1920
Indiana
Gubernatorial